Phillip Collins (born 10 January 1972) is an Irish former cyclist. He competed in the men's individual pursuit at the 1996 Summer Olympics.

References

External links
 

1972 births
Living people
Irish male cyclists
Olympic cyclists of Ireland
Cyclists at the 1996 Summer Olympics
Sportspeople from Dublin (city)
20th-century Irish people
21st-century Irish people